Estebán Pelaó Gratacós (10 January 1898 - 28 July 1980) was a Spanish footballer who played as a midfielder who played for CE Europa, Espanyol, and the Catalonia national team.

Club career
He spent most of his career at CE Europa, being a pivotal piece in turning the club into an important team in Catalonia, competing head-to-head against the likes of FC Barcelona and Espanyol, and together with Juan Pellicer, Manuel Cros and Antonio Alcázar, he helped the club win the 1922-23 Catalan Championship after beating Barça 1–0 in a play-off title-decider on 21 March 1923, thanks to a lonely goal from Alcázar. Pelaó was the captain of the club that day, and he then lead CE Europa to their first-ever Copa del Rey final in 1923, which they lost 0–1 to Athletic Bilbao, courtesy of a goal from Travieso. He retired in 1928 after a 12-year career.

International career
Being a CE Europa, he was eligible to play for the Catalonia national team, and together with Paulino Alcántara, Sagibarba and Josep Samitier, he helped the Catalan XI win the last edition of the Prince of Asturias Cup, an inter-regional competition organized by the RFEF, helping Catalonia beat Asturias in a two-legged title-decider.

Managerial career
As a coach, he managed CE Europa in the 1939–40 season.

Honours

Club
CE Europa
Catalan championship:
Champions (1): 1922–1923

Copa del Rey:
Runner-up (1): 1923

International
Catalonia XI
Prince of Asturias Cup:
Champions (1): 1926

References

1898 births
1980 deaths
Footballers from Barcelona
Spanish footballers
Association football midfielders
CE Europa footballers
RCD Espanyol footballers
Catalonia international footballers
Spanish football managers
CE Europa managers